Harry Lew (pinyin: Liào Zǐyuán; March 31, 1990 – April 3, 2011) was a Lance Corporal in the United States Marines who committed suicide at Patrol Base Gowragi in Afghanistan, allegedly after being hazed by his fellow Marines.

After investigation, three Marines stationed with Lew in Afghanistan, including his sergeant, were charged with hazing. Two were acquitted in courts-martial. The third pled guilty to lesser charges and was sentenced to limited punishment. Lew was a nephew of Congresswoman Judy Chu (D-CA); she has introduced a bill to prohibit hazing in the military, as the Department of Defense does not track it, and not all services have policies about it.

Background
Harry Lew was born in 1990 in Santa Clara, California. He was educated in local schools, graduating from Santa Clara High School.

Career
Lew enlisted in the Marines in 2009, intending to earn money so that he could go to college. In his second year, he was sent to Afghanistan in 2011 in his first combat deployment.

His unit held Patrol Base Gowragi in Helmand Province, Afghanistan.

Investigation
On April 3, 2011, Lew was found dead of a gunshot wound. He had been on guard duty at Patrol Base Gowragi in Afghanistan. His death was investigated by the Marines and determined to be suicide by gunshot to the head.

Following the investigation, three fellow Marines stationed with Lew, including his sergeant, were charged for hazing, which is prohibited in the military. According to the investigation, "he was subjected to a series of physical tasks, had sand dumped on his face, and was mercilessly kicked and punched in the helmet after falling asleep on guard duty for the fourth time at an austere patrol base". They said they were taking "corrective action" because of his mistakes in the combat zone, which could be deadly to other Marines. Congresswoman Chu has noted such physical abuse does not relate to the Marines' stated policy about how plans for corrective actions are to be developed and implemented by Marines in superior rank.

Jacob Jacoby
Lance Cpl. Jacoby was court-martialed on charges of hazing; the trial was held at the Marine Base at Kaneohe Bay, Hawaii. In testimony, he admitted that he punched and kicked Lance Cpl. Harry Lew at the outpost in Afghanistan. Jacoby's legal case ended on January 30, 2012, when he took a plea deal from prosecutors to lesser charges of assault. He was sentenced to 30 days in jail and reduction of rank.

Carlos Orozco III
Lance Cpl. Carlos Orozco III was accused of kicking sand in Lew's face and forcing him to do push-ups and leg lifts. LCPL Lew was wearing Orozco's jacket at the time of his death. LCPL Orozco had given the jacket to Lew the week prior. The panel of three officers and five enlisted Marines found Orozco not guilty at a court-martial at Marine Corps Base Hawaii in Kaneohe Bay.

Benjamin Johns
Sergeant Benjamin Johns was also cleared of hazing charges in the death of Harry Lew.

Aftermath
Following congressional hearings in 2012 in which military officials discussed their efforts to prevent hazing and suicide among military members, which has reached a historic high, Congresswoman Judy Chu and others introduced in May 2012 the "Harry Lew Military Hazing Accountability and Prevention Act". It was passed by the House as part of the National Defense Authorization Act. It is intended to require all services to prohibit hazing, to establish uniform tracking, and focus more on prevention. It was reintroduced into following sessions, as the Senate did not pass it.

Chu had requested that the GAO (Government Accountability Office), investigate the issue of hazing in the military. It released its report in February 2016, making several recommendations that were incorporated into a revised Harry Lew Act introduced by Chu in 2016. This was passed by the full Congress as S.2943 National Defense Authorization Act for Fiscal Year 2017; it was enacted, signed by the President on Dec 23, 2016.

See also 
 Suicide of Danny Chen
 List of hazing deaths in the United States

References 

2011 suicides
American military personnel who committed suicide
United States military scandals
2011 in military history
United States Marine Corps in the War in Afghanistan (2001–2021)
United States Marines
Bullying and suicide